Tërbaç is a community in the Vlorë County, southwestern Albania. At the 2015 local government reform it became part of the municipality Himarë.

Location

The village is located at the foothills of the Ceraunian Mountains and is adjacent to the village of Dukat, Brataj, Mesaplik, Vranisht, Palasë, Dhërmi. The area is rugged and mountainous, and is host to many streams and passes.

History
The origins of the village are tied to the Qafa e Shengjergjit, which was used in ancient times as a caravan route between the ancient city of Orikum and more inland cities, where we can mention Hora, Cerje, Amantia, etc. In the Tërbaç river, there are found the legs of the ancient bridge 2500–3000 years old of Bogdan. But there are also toponyms in Tërbaç like "Pellazg Tomb" or "Elim's Neck", which shed light on the idea that it has been inhabited since prehistoric times. Between the two mountain ranges, Akrokeraune and Lungarë, where the Akrokeraune are hit by the Karaburun mountain range, lies the divine village of Tërbaç. From the data found in the village of Tërbaç, from some excavations from 1969, they showed a settlement of the 4th century BC and earlier. There were earthenware vessels, a bronze atelier figure, bronze coins with Zeus-bolt and Zeus-snake. This Information was taken by An archaeological look at the Shushica valley (Damian Komata). The coins found in Tërbaç are unique and together with the coins found in Amantia, are the main and only coins of the period of Amants. The bronze atelier found in Tërbaç means that the inhabitants of this great place were civilised since the beginnings of civilization. Tërbaç is also known about its unique kind of dog in the world, the strongest dog "Molos", ore Tërbaç dog. This kind of dog was used by Aleksandër the Great. It is also known for its fauna and flora and for the many contrasts of weather, relief, geology, etc. This territory is known from prehistoric dates till nowadays for bravery, wisdom, hospitality, trust and a lot of other virtues. In the Middle Ages, in Shengjergj, there was a great civilization, verified by ceramics in every corner of the village, by toponyms and other archaeological evidence. Eventually the trail of Qafa e Shengjergjit was forgotten by merchants and now it is only used by sheepherders in contemporary times and by tourists sometimes.
In 1537, in the anti-Ottoman uprising of Labëria, a discourse was recorded, expressing the bravery of the people of this village and their victory over the forces of the Great Empire. Turkish dominance over the area was minuscule, but taxes in the form of herds and other commodities were taken by the local Ottoman administration. Villagers often ignored the taxes that the local Sanjak in Vlorë requested, thus in around the 1820s an Ottoman expeditionary force skirmished with the villagers and stole their goods as compensation for neglect of taxes. 
Another rare act of bravery is that of the brave Miro Strati Tërbaçi, an orphaned girl, who, in revenge for her brother who was treacherously killed by the Ottomans, got up and went to the barber and told him to shave her like a boy. After that, she took a horse and went to the Pasha of Berat and gave him two bullets, one in the chest and one in the forehead, and fought with those who followed her to save herself. The event took place in 1828. She died many years latter. Tërbaç was part of the battlefield of the battle of Gjorm, where Albanian resistance units defeated and routed the troops of the Kingdom of Italy. During World War II the German army was still very active in the area, even as the allies pushed up into northern Italy. Meanwhile, Partisans also were fighting against the Germans and Balli Kombëtar.

In Bramyshnjë-Tërbaç is the Olympian monolith of "Brigada e V-të Sulmuese", the bravest and most accomplished brigade of the Second World War, in terms of Albania, which fought from Tërbaçi to Novisad and back to Saranda. The eventual Communist victory led to the village being part of the Albanian Communist state for over fifty years, however after the fall of Hoxhaism, the village has seen a massive drop in population as people emigrate to different areas of the world, and migrate in Albania itself. Tërbaç is also known for its unique mountain of Çikë, the highest point in the seaside and for its unique Akrokeraunian ridge, where the phenomenon of lightning occurs. Nowadays, Tërbaç has a perspective on tourism and livestock and more work has to be done, to promote the values of this noble village.

Notable people 
Hysni Kapo, military commander and leading member of the Party of Labour of Albania.
Miro Tërbaçe, Semi-legendary heroin who slew the Sanjak of Vlora in retaliation for the treatment of the village, a statue of her is still in Tërbaç.

Sources
 Studime

Populated places in Himara
Villages in Vlorë County